The 1959–60 Irish Cup was the 80th edition of the premier knock-out cup competition in Northern Irish football. 

Linfield won the cup for the 27th time, defeating Ards 5–1 in the final at The Oval. 

The holders Glenavon were eliminated in the quarter-finals by Linfield.

Results

First round

|}

Replay

|}

Quarter-finals

|}

Replay

|}

Semi-finals

|}

Final

References

External links
The Rec.Sport.Soccer Statistics Foundation - Northern Ireland - Cup Finals

Irish Cup seasons
1959–60 in Northern Ireland association football
1959–60 domestic association football cups